Vintage is a Russian pop group formed in 2006 by the singer Anna Pletnyova and musician Alexey Romanov.

They have released 5 albums and sixteen radio singles, six of which headed the Russian radio-charts.

The group is a laureate and nominee of a number of musical awards, including MTV Russia Music Awards, Muz-TV Award, Golden Gramophone Award, RU.TV Award and others. Since 2008 Vintage is a steady laureate of Song of the Year award. In 2011 and 2012 it was named the best group of the year at ZD Awards based on a poll organised by Moskovskij Komsomolets.

History

2006 - 2007 Career Beginnings and first album 
Vintage was formed by ex-soloist of "High School" Anna Pletneva and former soloist of group "A-Mega" Alexei Romanov in mid 2006. Originally, they were going to name the band "Chelsea" but later changed it to "Vintage".

2007: the first album 

In late August, the group filmed the video for the song "Good-bye". The single appeared on radio stations in September and peaked at 14 in the Russian charts. In August and September, the group held a small promotional tour of Moscow and the Moscow region, in which they performed several concerts at clubs, and also performed at a beach party thrown by the radio station "Europe Plus".

On November 22 they released their first album, called "Криминальная любовь" ("Criminal Love"). A presentation of the disc was held on November 27 in the Moscow club "Opera".

2008 

On April 19 the video for new song of "Bad Girl" was released, a duet with actor Elena Korikova. On June 12, the single made third place in TopHit 100 - the only official Russian radio chart, and the song became the band's most successful single. Later, "Bad Girl" reached number one, having held out on it 2 weeks.

In October, there was a change in the group; Mia exits the band and Svetlana Ivanova replaced her.

2009 
In February, the group went on tour, visiting cities such as Moscow, Ulyanovsk, Riga, Minsk, Samara and Kaliningrad. On March 15 they released a new video for the song "Eva". This song was dedicated to singer Eva Polna. The single quickly became the band's most successful single to date, leading the Russian radio chart for 9 weeks.

On 31 August 2009, they released their fourth single from their forthcoming album "Lunatic Girls". The song had a social implication, and the video has become one of the most controversial of the group.

In October they released their second album "SEX". The record debuted at number 12 in the Russian album chart.

2010–2011 

While Vintage played live on Love Radio on April 16, they introduced a new single titled "(" ("Mikki"), which is dedicated to Michael Jackson. The band shot two versions of the video clip for the song; a Russian version and English translation. Although the single and video was not as successful as their previous tracks, the video was popular on Internet and became one of the most-discussed.

On September 11, Европа плюс (Europe Plus), Русское радио (Russkoe radio), Love-радио (Love-radio) and Свежее радио (Svezhee radio) released Vintage's latest song, "Роман" ("Roman"). The music video was released on Vintage's official Facebook page on October 23. "Roman" became Vintazh's most successful single to date, with over ten million views on the official music video.  The followup single "Derevya", ("Trees") was released in late 2011, followed by their third studio album "Anechka" ("Anny").

Band members 
Current
 Anna Pletnyova (2006-2016 + 2018–present)
 Alexey Romanov (2006-2017 + 2018–present)

Former
 Mia (2006–2008)
 Svetlana Ivanova (2008–2011)
Yevgenia Polikarpova (2016-2017;)
Anna Kornilova (2016-2017;)
Anastasia Kreskina (2016-2017;)
Anastasia Kazaku (2016-2017;)

Discography

Studio albums 
 «Криминальная любовь» "Criminal Love" (CD; Velvet Music; 2007 )
 «SEX» (CD; Velvet Music; 2009 )
 «Анечка» "Anny" (CD; Velvet Music; 2011)
 «Very Dance» (CD; Velvet Music; 2013)
 «Decamerone» (CD; Velvet Music; 2014)
 Навсегда (2020)

Singles 
 «Mamma Mia» (radio airplay; Velvet Music; 2006)
 «10 поцелуев (новогодняя версия)» "10 Kisses (Christmas Version)" (radio airplay; Velvet Music; 2006)
 «Мама Мия (Radio Edit)» "Mama Mia (Radio Edit)" (radio airplay; Velvet Music; 2007)
 «Целься» "Aim" (radio airplay; Velvet Music; 2007)
 «Всего хорошего» "All the best" (CD, radio airplay; Velvet Music; 2007)
 «Плохая девочка» "Bad girl" (CD, radio airplay; Velvet Music; 2008)
 «Одиночество любви» "Loneliness Love" (radio airplay; Velvet Music; 2008)
 «Ева» "Eve" (CD, radio airplay; Velvet Music; 2009)
 «Девочки-лунатики» "Lunatic Girls" (CD, radio airplay; Velvet Music; 2009)
 «Victoria» (Radio airplay, 2009)
 «Микки» "Mickey" (CD, Radio airplay; Velvet Music; 2010)
 «Роман» "Roman" (CD, Radio airplay; Velvet Music; 2010)
 «С Новым Годом» "Happy new year" (with Irakli, Vladimir Plesnyakov, A-Studio, Nyusha, Aleksey Chumakov, Yulia Kovalchuk) (2010)
 «Мама Америка» "Mama America" (2011)
 «Деревья» "Trees" (2011)
 «Москва» "Moscow" (2012)
 «Нанана» "Nanana" (2012)
 «Свежая вода» "Fresh water" (2012)
 «Знак Водолея» "The sign of Aquarius" (2013)
 «Когда Рядом Ты» "When I'm next to you" (2014)
 «Дыши» "Breathe" (2015)
 «Я верю в в любовь» "I Believe In Love" (2015)
 «Город, где сбываются мечты» "A city where dreams come true" (2015)
 «Сны» "Dreams" (2016)
 «Немного рекламы» "A Little Advertising" (2016)
 «Из Токио» "From Tokyo" (2020)
 «Новая Жизнь» "New Life" (2020)

References

External links 
 Vintage Official Site

Russian dance musicians
Russian pop music groups
Russian techno musicians
Musical groups established in 2006
Musical groups disestablished in 2017
English-language singers from Russia
Musical groups from Moscow
Winners of the Golden Gramophone Award